The ARM Cortex-A9 MPCore is a 32-bit multi-core processor that provides up to 4 cache-coherent cores, each implementing the ARM v7 architecture instruction set. It was introduced in 2007.

Features 

Key features of the Cortex-A9 core are:
 Out-of-order speculative issue superscalar execution 8-stage pipeline giving 2.50 DMIPS/MHz/core.
 NEON SIMD instruction set extension performing up to 16 operations per instruction (optional).
 High performance VFPv3 floating point unit doubling the performance of previous ARM FPUs (optional).
 Thumb-2 instruction set encoding reduces the size of programs with little impact on performance.
 TrustZone security extensions.
 Jazelle DBX support for Java execution.
 Jazelle RCT for JIT compilation.
 Program Trace Macrocell and CoreSight Design Kit for non-intrusive tracing of instruction execution.
 L2 cache controller (0–4 MB).
 Multi-core processing.

ARM states that the TSMC 40G hard macro implementation typically operates at 2 GHz; a single core (excluding caches) occupies less than 1.5 mm2 when designed in a TSMC 65 nanometer (nm) generic process and can be clocked at speeds over 1 GHz, consuming less than 250 mW per core.

Chips 

Several system on a chip (SoC) devices implement the Cortex-A9 core, including:
 Altera SoC FPGA
 AMLogic AML8726-M
 Apple A5, A5X
 Broadcom BCM11311 (Persona ICE)
 Calxeda EnergyCore ECX-1000
 Entropic EN7588, EN7530
 NXP Semiconductors (Formerly Freescale) QorIQ Layerscape LS1024A
 Freescale Semiconductor i.MX6
 HiSilicon K3V2 -Hi3620
 Marvell Avastar 88W8787, used in the Sony PlayStation Vita
 MediaTek MT6575 (single core), MT6577 (dual core)
 Mindspeed Technologies Mindspeed Comcerto 2000
 Nufront NuSmart 2816, 2816M, 115
 Nvidia Tegra 2 (without NEON extensions), Tegra 3 and Tegra 4i
 Trident Microsystems 847x/8x/9x SoC family
 Renesas Electronics RZ/A1H,M,L,LU Family
 Samsung Exynos 4210, 4212, 4412, 4415
 Rockchip RK3066, RK292x, RK31xx
 STMicroelectronics SPEAr1310, SPEAr1340
 ST-Ericsson Nova A9500, NovaThor U8500, NovaThor U9500
 Texas Instruments OMAP4 processors
 Texas Instruments Sitara AM437x
 WonderMedia WM8850, WM8950 and WM8980
 Xilinx Extensible Processing Platform
 ZiiLABS ZMS-20

Systems on a chip

See also

 ARM architecture
 List of ARM cores
 List of applications of ARM cores
 Comparison of ARMv8-A cores
 JTAG

References

External links 
ARM Holdings
 
 ARM Cortex-A9 Technical Reference Manuals
Other
 White paper - The ARM Cortex-A9 Processors
 RISC vs. CISC in the mobile era
 TI OMAP4440 specs
 STMicroelectronics SPEAr1310 Data brief
 RM Cortex-A9
 Popular ARM Cortex-A9 MPCore & Multi-core processor videos, YouTube.
 ARM Assembly language

ARM processors
ARM Holdings IP cores